Village Statistics, 1945 was a joint survey work prepared by the Government Office of Statistics and the Department of Lands of the British Mandate Government for the Anglo-American Committee of Inquiry on Palestine which acted in early 1946. The data were calculated as of April 1, 1945, and was later published and also served the UNSCOP committee that operated in 1947.

History
Previous versions of the report were prepared in 1938 and 1943.

The report found the grand total of the population of Palestine  was 1,764,520;  1,061,270 Muslims, 553,600 Jews, 135,550 Christians and 14,100 classified as "others" (typically Druze).

Regarding the accuracy of its statistics, the report said:
The last population census taken in Palestine was that of 1931. Since that year, the population has grown considerably both as a consequence of Jewish immigration and of the high rate of natural increase among all sections of the population. The rapidity of the change in the size of the population and the length of the period elapsed since the census rendered difficult the task of estimating the population. The population estimates published here are the result of a very detailed work conducted by the Department of Statistics, by using all the statistical material available on the subject. They cannot, however, be considered as other than rough estimates which in some instances may ultimately be found to differ even considerably, from the actual figures. The estimates for the whole of Palestine are to be considered as more reliable than those for sub-districts, while the sub-district estimates can, in turn, be considered as more reliable than those of the individual localities.

Population statistics were prepared in four stages.
 The settled population for the whole of Palestine was estimated using the 1931 census data together with natural increase and recorded immigration. Unrecorded immigration of Jews was estimated using data from ships arriving, arrests, and data prepared by the Jewish Agency.  Unrecorded immigration or emigration of Arabs could not be estimated "but these movements are not considered to be such as to involve very substantial errors".
 An initial population estimate for each sub-district was prepared from the 1931 census and natural increase, plus an allotment from the migratory increase. Then several methods were used to adjust the relative population of different sub-districts using calculations of natality, mortality and fertility in each sub-district.
 The settled population for each locality was provisionally estimated using several previous estimates made up to 1944. Then an overall adjustment was made to bring the total for each sub-district up to the sub-district population estimated at the previous step.
 The nomadic population estimated at the 1931 census was used since no reliable records for the changes were available.

Regarding the figures for land ownership, the report said: "The areas and ownership have been extracted from the Tax Distribution Lists, prepared under the provisions of the Rural Property Tax Ordinance, 1942, the Valuation Lists prepared under the Urban Property Tax Ordinance, 1940, and the Commuted Tithe records for Beersheba Sub-District, in the Gaza District."

Israeli geographer Moshe Brawer noted that the report was "an important if not the foremost source of information on population, land possession and land utilization" but questioned its accuracy on several grounds. For example, he wrote that aerial photographs showed the population of some localities to be exaggerated, and that land use classifications may have been biased towards categories that attracted lower taxes.

Gallery

See also
1922 census of Palestine
1931 census of Palestine

References

External links
  Scan of the 1938 edition at the National Library of Israel.
  Scan of the original document at the National Library of Israel.

 United Nations Conciliation Commission for Palestine, Appendix B, Non-Jewish Population within the Boundaries held by the Israel Defence Army on 1.5.49, as On 1.4.45, in accordance with the Palestine Government, Village Statistics, April 1945.
 Detailed statistics in spreadsheet form

1945
Jews and Judaism in Mandatory Palestine
Palestine
1945 in Mandatory Palestine